Miss Polonia 2012 was the 38th Miss Polonia pageant, held on February 2, 2013. The winner was Paulina Krupińska of Masovia and she represented Poland in Miss Universe 2013. 2nd Runner-Up, Aleksandra Szczęsna represented the country in Miss Earth 2013.

Final results

Judges
 Maciej Zień - Polish Fashion Creator
 Bogna Sworowska - 2nd Runner-Up at Miss Polonia 1987
 Witold Szmańda - Fitness Trainer
 Maciej Wróblewski - Hair Creator
 Izabela Grzybowska - Photographer
 Tomasz Kocewiak - Make-up Artist
 Jacek Rozenek - Actor
 Zbigniew Bartman - Polish representative in Volleyball
 Kamila Szczawińska - Model
 Małgorzata Herde - General Director of BMP

Official Delegates

Notes

Withdrawals
 Holy Cross
 Kuyavia-Pomerania
 Lower Silesia
 Lublin - Ira Watwat originally was a finalist but she was later forced to withdraw after breaking the rules of the grouping of the competition. No other finalists were from Lublin.
 Lubusz
 Silesia
 Polish Community in Lithuania

Did not compete
 Opole
 Polish Community in Argentina
 Polish Community in Australia
 Polish Community in Belarus
 Polish Community in Brazil
 Polish Community in Canada
 Polish Community in France
 Polish Community in Germany
 Polish Community in Israel
 Polish Community in Russia
 Polish Community in South Africa
 Polish Community in the U.K.
 Polish Community in the U.S.
 Polish Community in Venezuela

References

External links
Official Website

2012
2013 beauty pageants
2013 in Poland